Umaru Musa Yar’Adua University (UMYU), formerly Katsina State University, was established by the Katsina State Government in 2006, to "serve as a nucleus for socio-economic, technological and political development of the State by producing highly skilled human resource through conventional face-to-face and distance learning modes." Umaru Musa Yar'adua, then the executive governor of Katsina State and later the president of the Federal Republic of Nigeria, began the work of creating the university before his death in 2010.

The law establishing the Katsina State University was passed by the Katsina State House of Assembly on 5 September 2006, and the University commenced academic activities in January 2007 with three faculties (Education, Humanities, and Natural and Applied Sciences), and 16 undergraduate programmes. The State House of Assembly passed a law changing the name of the university to honor Umaru Musa Yar'adua on 8 April 2009.

The first 25 years of the university's existence have been divided into four phases—three phases of 5 years each, followed by a 10-year phase. In each phase, the university will add faculties, departments, and academic programmes, until it has a total of 13 faculties, 76 departments and 236 academic programmes (undergraduate and postgraduate).

The Visitor of the University is the serving governor of the state (currently Aminu Bello Masari); the Chancellor is Nigeria's one-time Minister of Economic Development, Dr. Umaru Mutallab; and the current Vice Chancellor (as of 2021) is Professor Sanusi Mamman.

History of the University

Faculties
Natural and Applied Sciences
Social and Management sciences
Humanities
Law
Medicine
Education

Faculty of Education 

Among the pioneer faculties in the University, Faculty of Education has the highest number of applicants and graduates highest number of students every year. The faculty has link with almost all the faculties and departments in the university where its students are expected to belong to another department for their second course. Thus, students of education are found in courses offered in the university except departments like Business Administration, Sociology, Political Science, and Political Science. In the year 2016, the Faculty offered admission to six hundred and twelve students

The Faculty is made of Departments of Education and that of Library and Information Science.

The Department offers education courses for undergraduate students in addition to the courses they receive from their second departments such as Arabic, Biology, Chemistry, Economics, English Language, Geography, Hausa, History, Islamic Studies, Mathematics, and Physics. The Department also offers post graduate courses in Curriculum, Educational Administration, Sociology of Education, Psychology of Education and Philosophy of Education for Masters and PhD students.
Since its inception, the Department of Education employed old timers in education drawn from colleges of education, polytechnics, and teachers with first and second degree working in secondary schools.
Among its Heads of Department are Ma'aruf Nuhu Batagarawa, Mani Ahmad, Sunusi Mamman, C. C. Okam, Yahaya Aliyu Sa'idu Kankara, Talatu Ibrahim Umar.

Courses offered 
Below are the list of courses offered by the university according to their respective faculties;

Faculty of Humanities 
 Arabic Studies
 English Language
 French Language
 Nigerian Language (Hausa)
 History
 Islamic studies

Faculty of Natural and Applied Sciences 
 Biochemistry
 Biology
 Chemistry
 Industrial Chemistry 
 Computer Science
 Geography
 Mathematics
 Physics
 Microbiology

Faculty of Education 
 Education and Arabic
 Education and Biology
 Education and Chemistry
 Education and Economics
 Education and English Language
 Education and Geography
 Education and Hausa
 Education and History
 Education and Islamic Studies
 Education and Mathematics
 Education and Physics

Faculty of Law 
 Islamic Law
 Common Law
Faculty of Social and Management Science

•  Accounting 

•  Business Administration

•  Economics 

•  International Relations

•  Political Science

•  Public Administration 

•  Local Government and Development Studies 

Additional programmes

The National Universities Commission has approved for the establishment of fourteen (14) new programmes in the university as follows:
 Medicine and Surgery (MBBS.)
 Forestry and Wildlife Management (B. Forestry)
 Integrated Science (B.Sc. (Ed.))
 Business Studies Education (B.Sc. (Ed.))
 Primary Education Studies (B.A. (Ed.))
 Early Childhood Education (B.A. (Ed.))
 Special Education (B.A. (Ed.))
 Computer Science Education(B.Sc. (Ed.))
 International Relations (B.Sc.)
 Environmental Management (B.Sc.)
 Local Government and Developmental Studies (B.Sc.)
 Meteorology (B.Sc.)
 Agricultural Science B. Agric)
 Fisheries and Aquaculture (B. Fisheries)

References

External links
 

Educational institutions established in 2006
2006 establishments in Nigeria
Public universities in Nigeria
Katsina